R(ex) R. Ryan, a pseudonym of Evelyn Bradley (1882–1950), was the author of twelve published horror/thriller novels.

Identity
There can be few authors in the horror–thriller genre as elusive as R. R. Ryan.  Until recently no biographical details about this author were known. Interest in the work of R. R. Ryan was limited to a few hard-core collectors until Karl Edward Wagner included three Ryan titles in his well-known lists of best horror novels for Twilight Zone magazine in 1983.

Following Wagner's death Ramsey Campbell acquired his collection of Ryan books and subsequently published the first critical article on Ryan in Necrofile.  Campbell also wrote an entry on Ryan for the St James Guide to Horror, Ghost and Gothic Writers.

In 2002 Midnight House reprinted Echo of a Curse with an introduction by D. H. Olsen with full descriptions and critical appraisal of all of the R. R. Ryan novels.  Like earlier commentators, Olsen maintained that Ryan was a woman, in part "due to Ryan's inability to depict convincing male characters, while her female characters are much more fully drawn", as well as "significant examples of typically female outlooks and attitudes pervading even the most male-dominated of her novels".

An article in the Ghost Story Society journal All Hallows revealed the existence of R. R. Ryan’s publishing contracts in the archives of Random House. The contracts indicate that one person appears to have been responsible for all of the Ryan novels, along with four others which appeared under two different names: three under the name Cameron Carr and one under the name John Galton. A children's book by Cameron Carr called The Thought Reader was published by W. Barton in the first half of the 1940s.

Recent research has shown that Rex Ryan was a pseudonym used by Evelyn Bradley, a theatrical manager who was born in Waterloo, Lancashire, in December 1882, and who lived much of his adult life in Hove, Sussex.  He is known to have written several plays in the same sensationalist vein as his novels.  Ryan took his own life in October 1950.  His daughter also wrote four thrillers in the 1940s under the name Kay Seaton.

Works
R. R. Ryan's work is variable in quality but much of it is literate, considering its often disturbing subject matter. In most of the books the plot device is the same: a menacing male father figure preys upon a vulnerable young girl. This is a standard device of gothic drama and early film (and of such novels as Sheridan Le Fanu's Uncle Silas).

The explicit threat of sexual violence is ever present in a Ryan novel, and this alone makes it unusual for a Herbert Jenkins book of the 1930s. Furthermore, the author controls the mounting tension in a way that can leave many readers feeling almost as traumatised as the fictional characters. These two aspects, coupled with the ingenuity of the plots, has made Ryan a popular author among connoisseurs of vintage weird fiction.

The novels published under the name Cameron Carr explore very similar though less fantastical paths. Although written with the same verve and style, these novels possess a deeper psychological depth than the R. R. Ryan books, suggesting that the author wished to compartmentalise his life by keeping the use of the names separate.

Bibliography

References 

English horror writers
1882 births
1950 deaths
English male novelists
20th-century English male writers
1950 suicides